Veneno (Spanish for "venom") or La Veneno may refer to:

 Lamborghini Veneno, a car
 Veneno (wrestler), Panamanian professional wrestler
 Jack Veneno, Dominican professional wrestler and politician
 Veneno (film), a 2018 biographical film about the wrestler
 La Veneno, Spanish transsexual vedette, singer and actress
 Veneno (TV series), a 2020 biographical TV series about La Veneno
 Kiko Veneno, Spanish musician
 Veneno, his debut album
 Veneno (album), an album by Brazilian band Banda Uó
 Veneno, a 2015 album by Duelo
 "Veneno" (song), by Anitta 
 "Veneno", a song by Jesse & Joy from ¿Con Quién Se Queda El Perro?
 Venenosaurus a dinosaur found in North America